Jokioinen is a municipality of Finland.

It is located in the Tavastia Proper region. The municipality is unilingually Finnish.

A notable tourist attraction in the region is the Jokioinen Museum Railway.

History
The history of Jokioinen is tightly connected to the Jokioinen estate, which was established in 1562. The estate developed into the largest estate in Finland during the time of the provincial governor Ernst Gustaf von Willebrand. At the beginning of 20th century the estate had a corn mill, saw mill, a brick factory, steel plant and a sugar and syrup factory.

Due to the crofters law of 1918 and the land reform law of 1945 the estate was split into more than 1500 homes and small farms. The rest of the estate was transferred to the ownership of the Finnish state in 1918. In 1928 the Department of Finnish Plant Breeding from Tikkurila and in 1957 the observatory from Pasila were transferred to the Jokioinen estate.

Climate 
Jokioinen has a humid continental climate of the warm-summer type (Köppen: Dfb), typical of the South Finnish fringe. In the past it falls to the continental subarctic zone (Dfc, based in old data) with only 3 months above 10 °C. The conditions are similar to Tampere, although it is more than 70 km to the north which shows influence of the urbanization in the climate.

Economy
Employment structure of Jokioinen by trade at the end of 2004 was following: Services 64.9%, processing 23.3%, agriculture and forestry economics 9.6%.

Major employers
MTT Agrifood Research Finland: 480
Jokioinen municipality: 305
Boreal Plant Breeding Ltd: 68
Jokioisten Leipä Oy (bakery): 45
Suomen Sokeri Oy Finnsugar (sugar mill): 44

Villages
Haapaniemi, Jokioinen, Jänhijoki, Kiipu, Lammi, Latovainio, Minkiö, Minkiön asema (Minkiö railway station), Niemi, Ojainen, Pellilä, Saari, and Vaulammi

Notable people
 Anneli Saaristo, (born 1949), singer

References

External links

 Municipality of Jokioinen – Official website

 
Municipalities of Kanta-Häme
Populated places established in 1873
1873 establishments in Finland